Donald James Toth (born May 31, 1948) is a Canadian provincial politician and was Speaker of the Legislative Assembly of Saskatchewan during the first term of the Saskatchewan Party government of Premier Brad Wall, from 2007 to 2011. He represented the constituency of Moosomin in the Legislative Assembly of Saskatchewan from 1986 to 2016. While he was originally elected as a member of the Progressive Conservatives, he and some other Tories and Liberals co-founded the Saskatchewan Party in 1997. On December 10, 2007, he was elected Speaker by acclamation. Dan D'Autremont defeated him in the speakership election in the second term of the Wall government (2011–2016).

He was educated at the University of Saskatchewan and the Full Gospel Bible Institution in Eston (now Eston College).

Toth did not run for reelection in 2016. He was the last sitting legislator who had served during the Grant Devine government of the 1980s.

References

 Legislative Assembly of Saskatchewan MLA Biography
 Saskatchewan Party MLA Biography
 Don Toth's webpage

Living people
1948 births
Saskatchewan Party MLAs
Speakers of the Legislative Assembly of Saskatchewan
21st-century Canadian politicians
Progressive Conservative Party of Saskatchewan MLAs
University of Saskatchewan alumni